Castle Peak is a mountain in the western United States, the highest peak in the White Cloud Mountains  of central Idaho and the Idaho Batholith. Located in Custer County, it is the 25th highest peak in the state, and the ninth most prominent.

Castle Peak is within the Cecil D. Andrus–White Clouds Wilderness, which is part of Sawtooth National Recreation Area in Custer County.

Castle Peak is managed by the U.S. Forest Service and the area surrounding the peak can be easily accessed. Camping is permitted anywhere is Sawtooth National Forest and the lakes surrounding Castle Peak provide excellent places to stay.  The peak rises to the northeast of Chamberlain Basin and south of Castle Lake and Merriam Peak.  There are trails from parking area to the vicinity of Castle Peak, although no trails go up the peak itself. The easiest route up Castle Peak is as class 3 scramble from the Chamberlain Basin.

A proposed open-pit molybdenum mine at the base of Castle Peak became a leading issue in the 1970 gubernatorial race, and advanced the formation of the Sawtooth NRA  In a rematch of the 1966 election, Cecil Andrus defeated incumbent Don Samuelson to become the state's first Democratic governor in nearly a quarter-century, and Republicans did not regain the governorship until January 1995.

See also

 List of mountain ranges in Idaho
 Idaho Batholith
 D. O. Lee Peak
 Born Lakes
 Chamberlain Basin

References

External links

Mountains of Idaho
Mountains of Custer County, Idaho
Sawtooth National Forest